Ladies' British Open Amateur Stroke Play Championship was founded in 1969 by the Ladies' Golf Union (now merged into The R&A) of Great Britain.

A stroke play tournament over 72 holes, it was discontinued by the R&A after the 2017 tournament won by Linn Grant in favour of a new Girls U16 Amateur Championship.

Notably, in 2000 Rebecca Hudson won the Ladies' British Open Amateur Championship match play title as well as the Ladies' British Open Amateur Stroke Play Championship. Leona Maguire, at age 16, was the youngest player to win the event.

Winners

See also
Ladies' British Open Amateur Championship

References

External links
Ladies Golf Union 2016 Yearbook - Past Winners 1996–2015

R&A championships
Amateur golf tournaments in the United Kingdom
Women's golf in the United Kingdom
1969 establishments in England
2017 disestablishments in England
Recurring sporting events established in 1969
Recurring sporting events disestablished in 2017